The Trafalgar Building can refer to:

Part of the Îlot-Trafalgar-Gleneagles complex in Montreal, Quebec, Canada
The Trafalgar Building, Hobart, in Hobart, Tasmania, Australia